Glacier Gardens was an indoor arena in San Diego, California. It opened in 1939. In that year, the San Diego Figure Skating Club was founded with the arena as its home. The club was incorporated in 1940. The arena was the venue for ice shows throughout the 1940s.  It hosted the Pacific Coast Hockey League's San Diego Skyhawks from 1944 to 1950. The arena held 5,000 people. The Skyhawks won the Pacific Coast Hockey League Championship for the 1948–1949 season. Glacier Gardens was located at the intersection of 8th and Harbor, just south of present-day Petco Park.

By 1956, the venue was known as just "The Arena".  Elvis Presley, with his backup band, guitarist Scotty Moore, bassist Bill Black, and drummer D. J. Fontana, appeared at the arena on April 4 and 5, 1956 and June 5 and 6, 1956. In the early 1960s, the arena was sub-leased for retail and auctions, then for manufacture of a miniature jeep, the Crofton Bug. The Arena was torn down a few years later. The San Diego Sports Arena, which in 2010 became the Valley View Casino Center, has served as a venue for minor league ice hockey and other indoor sports in San Diego since 1966.

References 

Indoor ice hockey venues in California
Sports venues in San Diego